Juvana is a Malaysian action crime film based on the action drama series of the same name director by Faisal Ishak. It was released on 24 January 2013.

Cast
 Johan As'ari as Botak 
 Zahiril Adzim as Daim 
 Syazwan Zulkifly as Apek 
 Adam Shahz as Ayam
 Khairul Mohamed as Komeng@Ain
 Megat Fazeril Faiz as Kicap
 Idzham Ismail as Panjang
 Sharnaaz Ahmad as Lan Todak
 Syafie Naswip as Jamal
 Adlin Aman Ramlie as Mr. Ali
 Shera Aiyob as Sara
 Sara Ali as Juriah
 Nabila Huda as Nurse 
 Rahhim Omar as Principal
 Seriwahyuni Jaes
 Kenji Sawahi as Head of the brick factory
 Raffi Khan as Warden Amirul
 Bront Palarae as Warden Encik Raja

Sequels
Two sequels called Juvana 2: Terperangkap Dalam Kebebasan, 2015 and Juvana 3: Perhitungan Terakhir, 2016, have since been released.

References

External links
 

Malay-language films
2013 films
Malaysian action films
Filmscape films
Films produced by Kabir Bhatia
Films directed by Faisal Ishak